Sylvain Rodrigue (born June 27, 1973) is a Canadian former ice hockey and roller hockey goaltender who is currently the goaltender coach for the HC Fribourg-Gottéron in Switzerland's National League A.

Roller hockey
Rodrigue played professional roller hockey with the Pittsburgh Phantoms during the 1994 RHI season, and with the Ottawa Loggers during the 1995 RHI season where he won the Outstanding Goaltender award for posting an .838 save percentage and a 6.06 goals-against average in seventeen regular-season matches. He also played in the 2nd Roller Hockey International All-Star Game.

Awards and honours

References

External links

1973 births
Canadian ice hockey goaltenders
Chicoutimi Saguenéens (QMJHL) players
Ducs d'Angers players
Edmonton Oilers coaches
Hershey Bears players
Living people
Ottawa Loggers players
Pittsburgh Phantoms (RHI) players
Ice hockey people from Montreal
Val-d'Or Foreurs players
Canadian expatriate ice hockey players in France
Canadian ice hockey coaches